Stacey Doubell (born 23 March 1987) is a South African retired badminton player.

Career 
In 2011, she won gold medal in women's doubles event, silver medal in mixed team event and bronze medals in women's singles and mixed doubles events at the African Games in Maputo, Mozambique. In 2015, she became the runner-up of South Africa International tournament in women's doubles event.

Achievements

All-Africa Games 
Women's singles

Women's doubles

Mixed doubles

African Championships 
Women's singles

Women's doubles

Mixed doubles

BWF International Challenge/Series 
Women's singles

Women's doubles

Mixed doubles

  BWF International Challenge tournament
  BWF International Series tournament
  BWF Future Series tournament

References

External links 
 
 

1987 births
Living people
South African female badminton players
Competitors at the 2007 All-Africa Games
Competitors at the 2011 All-Africa Games
African Games gold medalists for South Africa
African Games silver medalists for South Africa
African Games bronze medalists for South Africa
African Games medalists in badminton
21st-century South African women